A special election was held in  October 6–8, 1801 to fill a vacancy left by the resignation of John Bird (F) on July 26, 1801, prior to the first meeting of the 7th Congress.

Election results 

John P. Van Ness took his seat December 7, 1801, but did not complete the term, as he was appointed by President Thomas Jefferson as a major in the militia of the District of Columbia and on January 17, 1803, his seat was declared vacant and left vacant until the start of the Eighth Congress.

See also 
 List of special elections to the United States House of Representatives

References 

New York 1801 06
New York 1801 06
1801 06
New York 06
United States House of Representatives 06
United States House of Representatives 1801 06